Skou (Sekol, Sekou, Sko, Skouw, Skow, Sukou), or Tumawo (Te Mawo), is a Papuan language of Indonesia.

Distribution
The villages are:

 (Skou name: Te Tángpe), the westernmost and most populous Skou village
 (Skou name: Te Máwo), located between Skou Yambe and Skou Sai villages
 (Skou name: Te Bapúbi), the easternmost and least populous Skou village

Phonology

Consonants
The Skou consonants are:

Vowels
Vowels can be nasalized, except for /ɨ/ and /u/.

Tone 
Skou contrasts three different tones in monosyllables: high, low and falling, which can be combined with nasality for a six-way contrast.

Tone in Skou is affiliated with each word, rather than with each syllable. 

In addition to lexical differences in tone, tone has grammatical functions. 

For instance, tense in Skou is differentiated by tone.

Pronouns 
Skou differentiates three types of pronouns: free pronouns, genitive pronouns and dative pronouns.

References 

Donohue, Mark. 2004. A Grammar of the Skou language of New Guinea. Singapore: National University of Singapore.

Languages of western New Guinea
Western Skou languages